Joseph Lehner (29 October 1912, New York City – 5 August 2013, Haverford, PA) was a mathematician at Michigan State University (1957–1963),
the University of Maryland (1963–1972), and the University of Pittsburgh (1972–1980). He  worked on automorphic functions and introduced Atkin–Lehner theory.

Publications

References

20th-century American mathematicians
1912 births
2013 deaths
American centenarians
Men centenarians
Michigan State University faculty
University System of Maryland faculty
University of Pittsburgh faculty
University of Pennsylvania alumni